The Asia-Pacific Broadcasting Union (ABU or APBU), formed in 1964, is a non-profit, professional association of broadcasting organisations. It currently has over 287 members in 57 countries and regions, reaching a potential audience of about 3 billion people. The ABU's role is to help the development of broadcasting in the Asia-Pacific region and to promote the collective interests of its members. The ABU covers an area stretching from Turkey in the west to Samoa in the east, and from Mongolia in the north to New Zealand in the south. Its secretariat is located in Angkasapuri, Kuala Lumpur, Malaysia, its secretary-general, currently Dr Javad Mottaghi.

One of the ABU's activities is Asiavision, a daily exchange of news feeds by satellite among television stations in 20 countries in Asia. The ABU also negotiates coverage rights to major sports events for its members collectively, and carries out a wide range of activities in the programme and technical areas. The ABU provides a forum for promoting the collective interests of television and radio broadcasters, and encourages regional and international co-operation between broadcasters.

Full members must be national free-to-air broadcasters in the Asia-Pacific region, but there is an associate membership category that is open to provincial broadcasters, subscription broadcasters and national broadcasters in other parts of the world, and an affiliate category that is open to organisations connected to broadcasting.

Overview

The ABU's activities include:
a daily satellite TV news exchange (Asiavision)
co-production and exchange of programmes
negotiating rights for major sports events and organising coverage
technical, programming and management consultancy services
advising members on copyright and legal matters
rights-free content acquisition for developing countries
representing members in international forums
international frequency planning and coordination
organising seminars, workshops and training courses
annual competition for radio and television programmes (ABU Prizes)
a robot competition for engineering students (Robocon)
publication of ABU News and Technical Review
started 2012: ABU TV and Radio Song Festivals

The ABU works closely with the regional broadcasting . in other parts of the world on matters of common concern, and with many other international organisations, to exchange information on the latest developments in broadcasting, undertake activities to improve the skills and technologies of its members, and encourage harmonisation of operating and technical broadcasting standards and systems in the region. The ABU is funded primarily by annual subscriptions from members. The Union has an elected President and three Vice-Presidents, who serve three-year terms. The current President is Yoshinori Imai of NHK-Japan.

The ABU Secretariat is located in Angkasapuri, Kuala Lumpur, Malaysia. It has over 30 staff, of whom 12 are broadcast professionals recruited from among the ABU members within the region. The head of the Secretariat is the Secretary-General, who is appointed by the General Assembly. The current Secretary-General is Dr. Javad Mottaghi. The Asia-Pacific region is defined in the ABU statutes as countries within areas of Asia and the Pacific that lie substantially between the longitudes of 30 degrees east and 170 degrees west. On the map, this region stretches from Turkey in the west, to Samoa in the east, and from Russia in the north, to New Zealand in the south. All of the ABU's full members operate in this region.

Most of the ABU's associate members are European and North American broadcasters, many of whom have operations in Asia, and pay-TV and cable operators in the Asia-Pacific. Its affiliate members include satellite providers, telcos, production companies, equipment vendors and regulators. The ABU is the third largest of the world's eight broadcasting unions, but covers the largest geographic area of the world.

Membership
A number of different membership types are available to national broadcasters and national broadcasting organisations. These include full, additional full, associate, affiliate and institutional memberships.

Full members

 Below is a list of full members of the ABU. These are members who are independent nations within the ABU broadcasting region, and consist of two members per country. Broadcasters have the option to change between full and additional full membership.

Additional full members

 Below is a list of additional full members of the ABU. These are members who already have 2 full member organisations, and for countries in non-independent area.

Associate members

 Below is a list of associate members of the ABU. These are international broadcasters beyond the ABU region, and national broadcasting associations.

Institutional members

Affiliated members

{| class="wikitable sortable" style="font-size:91%;"
|-
! Country
! Broadcasting organisation
! National script
! Abbr.
|-
| rowspan="3"|  || Australian Film Television and Radio School || Australian Film Television and Radio School || AFTRS
|-
| Radio Frequency Systems || Radio Frequency Systems || RFS
|-
| Xtra Insights || Xtra Insights || 
|-
| rowspan="3"|  || Bangladesh NGOs Network for Radio and Communication || Bangladesh NGOs Network for Radio and Communication || BNNRC
|-
| National Institute of Mass Communication || — || NIMC
|-
| Pathshala South Asian Media Institute || Pathshala South Asian Media Institute || PSAMI
|-
|  || Agence Kampuchea Press || — || AKP
|-
|  || Videoship Enterprises Limited || Videoship Enterprises Limited || VEL
|-
| rowspan="3"|  || ADINNO, Inc || — || ADINNO
|-
| Communication University of China || 中国传媒大学 || CUC
|-
| Research and Training Institute of NRTA China || — || RTI of NRTA China
|-
|  || Pacific Islands News Association || — || PINA
|-
|  || Enensys Technologies || Enensys Technologies || ET
|-
| rowspan="4"|  || Fraunhofer Institute for Integrated Circuits || — || Fraunhofer IIS
|-
| Guntermann & Drunck GmbH || — || G&D
|-
| LS telcom AG|| — || Lstelcom
|-
| ORBAN Europe GmbH || — || ORBAN
|-
| rowspan="4"|  || APT Satellite Holdings || APT Satellite Company Limited || APT
|-
| AsiaSat || Asia Satellite Telecommunications Company Limited || AsiaSat
|-
| Sony Corporation of Hong Kong Ltd.|| Sony Corporation of Hong Kong (Previously called Professional Solutions Asia Pacific Company) || Sony
|-
| Younger Culture || Younger Culture C. Ltd || YCHK
|-
| rowspan="3"|  || Apalya Technologies || Apalya Technologies || Apalya
|-
| Broadcast Engineering Consultants India || Broadcast Engineering Consultants India Limited || BECIL
|-
| Canara Lighting Industries || Canara Lighting Industries PVT. LTD. || Canara
|-
| rowspan="3"|  || Infotech Solutions || Infotech Solutions || Infotech
|-
| Sekolah Tinggi Teknik Malang || Sekolah Tinggi Teknik Malang || STTM
|-
| REKAM Indonesia || REKAM Indonesia || REKAM
|-
| rowspan="2"|  || Iran Broadcasting University || IRIB University || IRIB
|-
| Soroush Multimedia Corporation || — || SMC
|-
| rowspan="10"|  || Broadcasting Satellite System Corporation || 放送衛星システム株式会社 || B-SAT
|-
| Ikegami Tsushinki || 池上通信機株式会社 || Ikegami
|-
| Japan International Broadcasting Inc. || 日本国際放送株式会社 || JIB
|-
| Japan Media Communication Center || 日本メディアコミュニケーションセンター || JAMCO
|-
| NHK Engineering Systems || — || NHK NES
|-
| NHK Enterprise|| — || NEP
|-
| NHK Global Media Services|| — || NHK G-Media
|-
| NHK Integrated Technology|| — || NHK ITEC
|-
| NHK International || NHK International, Inc || NHK Int.
|-
| TI ComNet International Visual Works || — || TI ComNet
|-
|  || SpaceTech TV Engineering || SpaceTech TV Engineering || SpaceTech TV
|-
|  || Kazmedia Ortalygy || Management Company “Kazmedia Ortalygy” LLP || KMO
|-
| rowspan="8"|  || Al Jazeera International || Aljazeera International (Malaysia) Sdn Bhd || CELCOM
|-
| Celcom || Celcom Axiata Berhad' || CELCOM
|-
| Happy Campers Productions || Happy Campers Productions SDN BHD || 
|-
| MEASAT Satellite Systems || MEASAT Satellite Systems || MEASAT
|-
| MYTV Broadcasting || MYTV Broadcasting Sdn Bhd || MYTV
|-
| Shekhinah PR || Shekhinah PR Sdn. Bhd || SPR
|-
| Spacelabs Technology || Spacelabs Technology Sdn Bhd || Spacelabs
|-
| WSL MSC || WSL MSC Sdn Bhd ||
|-
|  || Maldives Broadcasting Commission || — || MBC
|-
|  || Multi Carrier || Multi Carrier (Mauritius) Limited || MCML
|-
|  || Karnali Integrated Rural Development And Research Centre || कर्णाली एकीकृत ग्रामीण विकास तथा अनुसन्धान केन्द्र || KIRDARC
|-
|  || Nevion || Nevion (formerly known as T-VIPS) ||
|-
|  || Pakistan Electronic Media Regulatory Authority || Pakistan Electronic Media Regulator Authority || PEMRA
|-
|  || Media Development Center / Birzeit University || مركز تطوير الإعلام / جامعة بيرزيت || MDC / BU
|-
|  || National Information & Communications Technology Authority || — || NICTA
|-
|  || Courseline Media International Training Services || — || CMITS
|-
| rowspan="18"|  || Bang Singapore Pte Ltd || — || BSPL
|-
| Bangladesh Broadcast Systems || Bangladesh Broadcast Systems || BBS
|-
| KIT Digital || Benchmark Broadcast Systems (S) Pte. Ltd. || BSS
|-
| Dolby Laboratories Inc. || Dolby Laboratories Inc. || Dolby
|-
| Elevate Broadcast Systems || — || EB
|-
| Encompass Digital Media || Encompass Digital Media (Asia) Pte Ltd || EDM
|-
| Eutelsat Asia || — || EA
|-
| EEVA Productions || — || EEVA
|-
| Globecast Asia || Globecast Asia Pte Ltd || GCA
|-
| Infocomm Media Development Authority || 资讯通信媒体发展局 || IMDA
|-
| MediaGenix || — ||
|-
| NewTec Asia Pacific Pte Ltd|| — || NewTec
|-
| Panasonic Systems Asia Pacific || — || Panasonic
|-
| Sport Singapore || — || SPORTSG
|-
| Telesto Broadcast Solutions|| Telesto Broadcast Solutions Pte Ltd || TBSPL
|-
| Telstra Singapore Pte Ltd || — || Telstra Global
|-
| Thinking Tub Media Pte Ltd || — || TTM
|-
| Whiteways Systems Pte Ltd || — || WW
|-
| rowspan="2"|  || Digital Video Broadcasting || — || DVB
|-
| Università Svizzera Italiana || Università Svizzera Italiana || USI
|-
|  || Office of the National Broadcasting and Telecommunications Commission || สำนักงานคณะกรรมการกิจการกระจายเสียง กิจการโทรทัศน์ และกิจการโทรคมนาคมแห่งชาติ || NBTC
|-
|  || Radio and Television Broadcasting Professional Association || Radyo Televizyon Yayınları Meslek Birliği || RATEM
|-
| rowspan="4"|  || Encompass Digital Media Services Limited || — || Encompass
|-
| International Association of Broadcasting Manufacturers || International Association of Broadcasting Manufacturers || IABM
|-
| New Media Networks || — || NMN
|-
| The Insigths People || — || TIP
|-
|  || iBiquity Digital Corporation || — || iBDC
|-
|  || National Association of Electronical Mass Media || Elektron ommaviy axborot vositalari milliy assotsiatsiyasi || NAEMM
|}

Other activities

Emergency Warning Broadcasting System (EWBS) for the Asia-Pacific region
EWBS development work has focused on identifying a suitable country code methodology. This system of codes has now been standardised by ITU-R. The General Assembly in Beijing endorsed the work carried out by the TC and issued an ABU Declaration calling all members to encourage their respective governments to implement an EWBS system.

ABU Engineering Excellence Awards

ABU Engineering Industry Excellence Award and ABU Broadcast Engineering Excellence Award are presented annually to broadcast personalities who have made significant contributions respectively to their organisations and to the industry as a whole. They are selected from nominations made by ABU members and followed by an evaluation process by a panel of judges. The Broadcast Engineering Excellence Award is being sponsored by Broadcast and Professional Pacific Asia Company (BPPA). The award includes a study tour of Sony research facilities.

Publications
The ABU publishes the ABU News magazine while the Technical Department publishes the Technical Review''. Both publications are published quarterly. They are sent free to members and non-affiliates and published in print version, downloadable in PDF format through the ABU's Publications area of the ABU's website and on ABU's app on Android. The ABU also publishes books related to broadcasting which is available in print.

Inter-union activities
The World Broadcasting Unions (WBU) brings together eight unions including the ABU. The WBU has a number of specialised forums, including the International Satellite Operations Group (WBU-ISOG) and the Technical Committee (WBU-TC). The ABU is an active member of both.

See also 

ABU Song Festivals
African Union of Broadcasting
Arab States Broadcasting Union
Asia-Pacific Robot Contest
Association for International Broadcasting
Caribbean Broadcasting Union
Caribbean News Agency
Commonwealth Broadcasting Association
Commonwealth Press Union
European Broadcasting Union
International Telecommunication Union
National Association of Broadcasters
North American Broadcasters Association
Organización de Telecomunicaciones de Iberoamérica
Smart Alliance
World Radio Network

References

External links

Asia-Pacific Broadcasting Union

Broadcasting associations
Organizations established in 1964
Organisations based in Kuala Lumpur
International organisations based in Malaysia